Asp House was a minor Hudson's Bay Company post on the Rainy River. It was built at the time when the HBC was pushing inland to regain the trade that had been diverted to Montreal by the Northwest Company.

In 1793 John McKay (fur trader) of the Hudson's Bay Company left Fort Albany, Ontario on James Bay and went south to compete with the Northwest Company. In September he went up the Rainy River and built an unnamed post below Manitou Falls and 12 miles below the NWC post at Fort Lac la Pluie. It was supplied from Fort Albany but needed supplements from local hunting and fishing. Trade produced only 18 packs of fur.  

In 1794 he built a second post upstream from the mouth of Rainy River since the Indians of Lake of the Woods did not wish to travel upriver. It was called Asp House. In October of that year Charles Boyer came down from Lac la Pluie and built a competing house 200 years away. Boyer had a difficult time had closed his post the following April. In 1797 it was left unoccupied and was subsequently pillaged and burned by rivals from Montreal. In 1825 the Hudson's Bay Company built Hungry Hall close to the location of the former Asp House. The site is at the current Oak Grove Camp. There is a historical marker on the riverbank.

References

 Elizabeth Browne Losey,"Let Them Be Remembered: The Story of the Fur Trade Forts",1999
 Manitoba archives /search /HBCA online:-search Asp Hall 

Hudson's Bay Company trading posts